Georg Maier (27 September 1941 – 1 January 2021) was a German actor and theatre director.

Biography
In 1966, Georg became director of the Iberl-Bühne, a theatre in Munich which exhibited folk plays in the Bavarian language.

Awards
Medaille München leuchtet (1996)
Bayerischer Poetentaler (1997)
Order of Merit of the Federal Republic of Germany (2001)
Ernst-Hoferichter-Preis (2002)

Filmography
Familie Meier (1983)
Irgendwie und Sowieso (1986)
Hindafing (2016)

References

1941 births
2021 deaths
German actors
German theatre directors
Recipients of the Cross of the Order of Merit of the Federal Republic of Germany